The Netherlands Football League Championship 1919–1920 was contested by 41 teams participating in 4 divisions. The national champion would be determined by a play-off featuring the winners of the eastern, northern, southern and western football division of the Netherlands. Be Quick 1887 won this year's championship by beating VOC, Go Ahead and MVV Maastricht.

New entrants
Eerste Klasse East:
Promoted from 2nd Division: HVV Hengelo
Eerste Klasse South:
Promoted from 2nd Division: 't Zesde (returning after five seasons of absence) & Bredania 
Eerste Klasse West:
Moving in from Division West-B: AFC

Divisions

Eerste Klasse East

Eerste Klasse North

Eerste Klasse South

Eerste Klasse West

Championship play-off

References
RSSSF Netherlands Football League Championships 1898-1954
RSSSF Eerste Klasse Oost
RSSSF Eerste Klasse Noord
RSSSF Eerste Klasse Zuid
RSSSF Eerste Klasse West

Netherlands Football League Championship seasons
1919–20 in Dutch football
Netherlands